The Women's Orchestra of Auschwitz (Mädchenorchester von Auschwitz; lit. "Girls' Orchestra of Auschwitz") was formed by order of the SS in 1943, during the Holocaust, in the Auschwitz II-Birkenau extermination camp in German-occupied Poland. Active for 19 months—from April 1943 until October 1944—the orchestra consisted of mostly young female Jewish and Slavic prisoners, of varying nationalities, who would rehearse for up to ten hours a day to play music regarded as helpful in the daily running of the camp. They also held a concert every Sunday for the SS.

A member of the orchestra, Fania Fénelon, published her experiences as an autobiography, Sursis pour l'orchestre (1976), which appeared in English as Playing for Time (1977). The book was the basis of a television film of the same name in 1980, written by Arthur Miller.

Formation
The orchestra was formed in April 1943 by SS-Oberaufseherin Maria Mandl, supervisor of the women's camp in Auschwitz, and SS-Hauptsturmfuhrer Franz Hössler, the women's camp commandant. The Germans wanted a propaganda tool for visitors and camp newsreels and a tool to boost camp morale. Led at first by a Polish music teacher, Zofia Czajkowska, the orchestra remained small until Jews were admitted in May 1943. Its members came from many countries, including Austria, Belgium, Czechoslovakia, France, Germany, Greece, Hungary, Poland, the Netherlands and USSR.

According to professor of music Susan Eischeid, the orchestra had 20 members by June 1943; by 1944 it had 42–47 players and 3–4 musical copyists. Its primary role was to play (often for hours on end in all weather conditions) at the gate of the women's camp when the work gangs left and returned. They might also play during "selection" and in the infirmary.

In the early months, the ensemble consisted mainly of amateur musicians, with a string section, accordions and a mandolin; it lacked a bass section. The orchestra acquired its limited instruments and sheet music from the men's orchestra of the main Auschwitz camp. The repertoire of the orchestra was fairly limited, in terms of the available sheet music, the knowledge of the conductor and the wishes of the SS. It played mostly German marching songs, as well as the Polish folk and military songs that Czajkowska knew. It included two professional musicians, cellist Anita Lasker-Wallfisch, and vocalist/pianist Fania Fénelon, each of whom wrote memoirs of their time in the orchestra. Wallfisch, for example, recollected being told to play Schumann's Träumerei for Josef Mengele.

Conductors
The first conductor, Zofia Czajkowska, a Polish music teacher, was active from April 1943 until she was replaced by Alma Rosé, an Austrian-Jewish violinist, in August that year. The daughter of Arnold Rosé, leader of the Vienna Philharmonic Orchestra, and niece of Gustav Mahler, Rosé had been the conductor of the Wiener Walzermädeln, a small orchestra in Vienna, and had arrived in Auschwitz from the Drancy internment camp in Paris.

By January 1944, the orchestra had 47 members, including five singers. Rosé died suddenly on 5 April 1944, possibly from food poisoning, after having dinner with a kapo (an inmate with special privileges). The third conductor was Sonia Winogradowa, a Ukrainian pianist. For several reasons, including reduced rehearsal time and Winogradowa's lack of experience, the orchestra's performance declined. It stopped performing in October 1944.

Move to Bergen-Belsen
On 1 November 1944, the Jewish members of the women's orchestra were evacuated by cattle car to the Bergen-Belsen concentration camp in Germany, where there was neither orchestra nor special privileges. Three members, Charlotte "Lola" Croner, Julie Stroumsa and Else, were murdered there. On 18 January 1945, non-Jewish women in the orchestra, including several Poles, were evacuated to Ravensbrück concentration camp. Fénelon was interviewed by the BBC on 15 April 1945, the day of Bergen-Belsen's liberation by British troops, and sang "La Marseillaise" and "God Save the King".

Books
The best known publication about the orchestra is Fania Fénelon's memoir, Playing for Time (1977), first published in Paris as Sursis pour l'orchestre (1976). The memoir and subsequent TV adaptation assumed an important place in Holocaust scholarship. This was a source of frustration to other survivors of the orchestra, who disagreed with Fénelon's representation of the orchestra, particularly her portrayal of Alma Rosé and several other musicians, and the diminishment by Fénelon of their bond and support for one another. Fénelon presents Rosé as a cruel disciplinarian and self-hating Jew who admired the Nazis and courted their favor. A biography, Alma Rosé: From Vienna to Auschwitz (2000), by Rosé family friend Richard Newman and Karen Kirtley, presents a different picture.

List of members
Listed alphabetically by birth name or by first name where no surname is known.

Conductors
Zofia Czajkowska, Polish music teacher, first conductor, conducted until August 1943.
Alma Rosé, violin, Austrian, second conductor, died 5 April 1944.
Sonia Winogradowa, copyist, piano, voice, Ukrainian, third conductor.

Players

Margot Anzenbacher (later Větrovcová), guitar, Czech
Lilly Assael, Jewish, Greek
Yvette Assael (later Lennon), Greek
Stefania Baruch, music teacher, played guitar and mandolin
Esther Lowey Béjarano (Sarah Weiss), pianist, singer, accordion
Zofia Cykowiak (Zocha Nowak), Polish
Henryka Czapla, Polish
Helena Dunicz-Niwińska (Halina Opielka), violin, Polish, Nr. 64118, author of One of the Girls in the Band: The Memoirs of a Violinist from Birkenau (2014)
Fania Fénelon, piano and voice, French, Nr. 74862 author of Sursis pour l'orchestre (1976).
Henryka Gałązka, violin, Polish
Marta Goldstein
Hilde Grünbaum
Danuta Kollakowa, drums, piano, Polish
Fanny Kornblum (later Birkenwald)
Marie Kroner (murdered in Auschwitz)
Regina Kupferberg (later Rivka Bacia), Jewish
Irena Łagowska, Polish
Maria Langenfeld, Polish
Anita Lasker-Wallfisch (Marta Goldstein), cello, Jewish
Lotta Lebedová, Jewish from Bohemia.
Kazimiera Małys
Lily Mathé,(fr), Hungarian
Elsa Miller (later Felstein), violin, Belgian, Jewish
Claire Monis, French (fr)
Maria Moś-Wdowik, Polish
Hélène Rounder-Diatkin (fr)
Hélène Scheps (Irène Szal)
Helga Schiessel, piano, Jewish, German
Ruth Schiessel, Jewish, German
Flora Schrijver-Jacobs
Violette Jacquet Silberstein (Florette Fenet) violin, violin, Jewish, born in Romania
Helen Spitzer Tichauer
Eva Steiner (Ewa Stern), Transylvania [present-day Romania], Jewish, singer 
Madam Steiner, mother of Eva, Transylvania [present-day Romania], Jewish, violinist
Ewa Stojowska, Polish
Ioulia "Julie" Stroumsa, Jewish, Greek (murdered in Bergen-Belsen)
Szura, guitar, Ukraine
Carla Wagenberg, Tamar Berger, Jewish, German, sister of Sylvia Wagenberg
Sylvia Wagenberg, Jewish, German
Irena Walaszczyk
Jadwiga Zatorska, violin, Polish
Rachela Zelmanowicz-Olewski, mandolin, Jewish, Poland

Notes

References

Further reading
External links
"The Girls in the Auschwitz Band". thegirlsintheauschwitz.band (names of band members and some information).
 

Films
Linda Yellen (1980). Playing for Time. Television film based on Arthur Miller's stage adaptation.
Christel Priemer (1992). Esther Bejarano and the girl orchestra of Auschwitz.
Michel Daeron (2000). Bach in Auschwitz.

Books

Fania Fénelon and Marcelle Routier. Playing for Time.  Translated from the French by Judith Landry.  Atheneum New York 1977. .
Fania Fénelon and Marcelle Routier. Sursis pour l'orchestre. Témoignage recueilli par Marcelle Routier.  Co-édition Stock/Opera Mundi. Paris 1976. .
Esther Bejarano and Birgit Gärtner. Wir leben trotzdem. Esther Bejarano--vom Mädchenorchester in Auschwitz zur Künstlerin für den Frieden.  Herausgegeben vom Auschwitz-Komitee in der Bundesrepublik Deutschland [We Live Nevertheless] e.V. Pahl-Rugenstein Verlag Bonn, 2007. 
Esther Bejarano, Man nannte mich Krümel. Eine jüdische Jugend in den Zeiten der Verfolgung.  Herausgegeben vom Auschwitz-Komitee in der Bundesrepublik e.V. Curio-Verlag Hamburg 1989. 
Richard Newman and Karen Kirtley, Alma Rosé. Vienna to Auschwitz. Amadeus Press Portland Oregon 2000. 
Anita Lasker-Wallfisch, Inherit the Truth. A Memoir of Survival and the Holocaust.  St. Martin's Press New York 2000. 
Gabriele Knapp, Das Frauenorchester in Auschwitz. Musikalische Zwangsarbeit und ihre Bewältigung. von Bockel Verlag Hamburg 1996. 
Violette Jacquet-Silberstein and Yves Pinguilly, Les sanglots longs des violons... Avoir dix-huit ans à Auschwitz. Publié par les éditions Oskarson (Oskar jeunesse) Paris 2007. Previously published with the title Les sanglots longs des violons de la mort. 
Jacques Stroumsa. Violinist in Auschwitz. From Salonica to Jerusalem 1913-1967.  Translated from German by James Stewart Brice. Edited by Erhard Roy Wiehn. Hartung-Gorre Verlag. Konstanz (mentions Julie Stroumsa)
Mirjam Verheijen. Het meisje met de accordion: de overleving van Flora Schrijver in Auschwitz-Birkenau en Bergen-Belsen. Uitgeverij Scheffers Utrecht 1994. 
Rachela Zelmanowicz Olewski. Crying is Forbidden Here! A Jewish Girl in pre-WWII Poland, The Women's Orchestra in Auschwitz and Liberation in Bergen-Belsen. Edited by Arie Olewski and his sister Jochevet Ritz-Olewski. Based on her Hebrew testimony, recorded by Yad-Vashem on 21 May 1984. Published at the Open University of Israel 2009. 
Jean-Jacques Felstein. Dans l'orchestre d'Auschwitz - Le secret de ma mère. Auzas Éditions Imago Paris 2010. 
Bruno Giner. Survivre et mourir en musique dans les camps nazis.  Éditions Berg International 2011. 

Musical groups established in 1943
Musical groups disestablished in 1945
1943 establishments in Germany
1945 disestablishments in Germany
Auschwitz concentration camp
Polish orchestras
Youth orchestras
Women's orchestras
Disbanded orchestras
Jewish musical groups
Women in World War II